This is a list of Ranji Trophy records, with each list containing the top five performances in the category. The Ranji Trophy is the premiere first-class cricket competition in India.

Currently active players are bolded.

Batting records

Most career runs

Highest individual scores

Most career centuries

Highest career average
Qualification: 3500+ runs

Most runs in a season

Bowling records

Most career wickets

Best bowling figures in an innings

Most wickets in a season

Team records

Highest innings totals

Lowest innings totals

Highest partnerships per wicket

See also
 List of Hat-tricks in Ranji trophy

Notes

All lists are referenced to CricketArchive.

External links
 Ranji Trophy records in ESPN Cricinfo

History of Indian cricket
Ranji Trophy
Indian cricket lists
Lists of Indian cricket records and statistics